Carathéodory's theorem is a theorem in convex geometry.

The similar theorems of Helly and Radon are closely related to Carathéodory's theorem: the latter theorem can be used to prove the former theorems and vice versa.

The result is named for Constantin Carathéodory, who proved the theorem in 1911 for the case when  is compact. In 1914 Ernst Steinitz expanded Carathéodory's theorem for arbitrary set.

Example 

Carathéodory's theorem in 2 dimensions states that we can construct a triangle consisting of points from P that encloses any point in the convex hull of P.

For example, let P = {(0,0), (0,1), (1,0), (1,1)}. The convex hull of this set is a square. Let x = (1/4, 1/4) in the convex hull of P. We can then construct a set {(0,0),(0,1),(1,0)} = ′, the convex hull of which is a triangle and encloses x.

Proof
Note: We will only use the fact that  is a field, so the theorem and proof works even when  is replaced by any field .

We first formally state Carathéodory's theorem:

The essence of Carathéodory's theorem is in the finite case.

With the lemma, Carathéodory's theorem is a simple extension:

Alternative proofs uses Helly's theorem or the Perron–Frobenius theorem.

Variants

Carathéodory's number 

Carathéodory's theorem simply states that any nonempty subset of  has Carathéodory's number . This upper bound is not necessarily reached. For example, the unit sphere in  has Carathéodory's number equal to 2, since any point inside the sphere is the convex sum of two points on the sphere.

Dimensionless variant 
Recently, Adiprasito, Barany, Mustafa and Terpai proved a variant of Caratheodory's theorem that does not depend on the dimension of the space.

Colorful Carathéodory theorem 
Let X1, ..., Xd+1 be sets in Rd and let x be a point contained in the intersection of the convex hulls of all these d+1 sets.

Then there is a set T = {x1, ..., xd+1}, where x1 ∈ X1, ..., xd+1 ∈ Xd+1, such that the convex hull of T contains the point x.

By viewing the sets X1, ..., Xd+1  as different colors, the set T is made by points of all colors, hence the "colorful" in the theorem's name. The set T is also called a rainbow simplex, since it is a d-dimensional simplex in which each corner has a different color.

This theorem has a variant in which the convex hull is replaced by the conical hull.  Let X1, ..., Xd be sets in Rd and let x be a point contained in the intersection of the conical hulls of all these d sets. Then there is a set T = {x1, ..., xd}, where x1 ∈ X1, ..., xd ∈ Xd, such that the conical hull of T contains the point x.

Mustafa and Ray extended this colorful theorem from points to convex bodies.

The computational problem of finding the colorful set lies in the intersection of the complexity classes PPAD and PLS.

See also

 Shapley–Folkman lemma
 Helly's theorem
 Kirchberger's theorem
 Radon's theorem, and its generalization Tverberg's theorem
 Krein–Milman theorem
 Choquet theory

Notes

Further reading

External links

 Concise statement of theorem in terms of convex hulls (at PlanetMath)

Articles containing proofs
Convex hulls
Geometric transversal theory
Theorems in convex geometry
Theorems in discrete geometry